Andrey Vasilievich Abramov (5 December 1935 – 4 May 1994) was a Russian boxer from the Soviet Union. He competed in the men's heavyweight event at the 1960 Summer Olympics.

He won three gold medals at the European Amateur Boxing Championships: at Prague 1957, Lucerne 1959, Belgrade 1961, and silver one at Moscow 1963, all in the Heavyweight division.

References

1935 births
1994 deaths
Soviet male boxers
Russian male boxers
Olympic boxers of the Soviet Union
Boxers at the 1960 Summer Olympics
Heavyweight boxers